Tramazoline is a chemical that is used in the form of tramazoline hydrochloride in nasal decongestant preparations. It is an α-adrenergic receptor agonist that inhibits secretion of nasal mucus.

It was patented in 1961 and came into medical use in 1962.

Brand names 

Australia
 Spray-Tish 
 Rhinaspray
Austria
 Rhinorix
Belgium
 Rhinospray
Bulgaria
 Muconasal Plus
Czech Republic
 Muconasal Plus
Germany
 Biciron
 Ellatun
 Rhinospray
Hungary
 Rhinospray Plus
Italy
 Rinogutt
 Fexallegra nasale (Tramazoline + Chlorpheniramine, 1 mg/ml + 3.55 mg/ml)
Portugal
 Rhinospray
Romania
 Muconasal Plus (older)
 Muconasal (newer)
Russia
 Adrianol (tramazoline + phenylephrine)
 Lasolvan Rhino
Spain 
 Rhinospray
Slovakia
 Muconasal Plus
Ukraine
 Lasorin

References

Imidazolines
Tetralins